Vanderbylia is a genus of fungi in the family Polyporaceae. It was circumscribed by British mycologist Derek Reid in 1973.

Species
Vanderbylia borneensis  Corner (1987)
Vanderbylia latissima  (Bres.) D.A.Reid (1973)
Vanderbylia nigroapplanata  (Van der Byl) D.A.Reid (1975)
Vanderbylia peninsularis  Corner (1987)
Vanderbylia subincarnata  Corner (1987)
Vanderbylia ungulata  D.A.Reid (1973)
Vanderbylia vicina  (Lloyd) D.A.Reid (1973)

References

Polyporaceae
Polyporales genera
Taxa described in 1973
Taxa named by Derek Reid